Mhine Ohn Khaing (born 1 January 1961) is a Burmese politician who currently serves as a House of Nationalities member of parliament for Shan State No. 11 constituency.

Early life and education
He was born on 1 January 1961 in Shan State, Burma(Myanmar). He graduated with Dip.Ag., B.Sc. and H.G.P. from Lashio University and Mandalay University.

Political career
He is a member of the Ta'ang National Party. In the Myanmar general election, 2015, he was elected as an Amyotha Hluttaw MP, winning a majority 37545 votes and elected representative from Shan State No. 11 parliamentary constituency  . He also serves as a member of Amyotha Hluttaw Health, Sports and Culture Committee.

References

Ta'ang National Party politicians
1961 births
Living people
People from Shan State
Mandalay University alumni